Martin George Page (born 23 September 1959) is an English singer-songwriter and bassist. Page has collaborated with artists such as Paul Young, Starship, Robbie Robertson, Earth, Wind & Fire, Heart, Robbie Williams and Go West.

Early life
Page was born in Southampton, Hampshire, England, to Alan Richard Page (an aviation engineer) and Ruth Pamela Page. During a good portion of his childhood, Martin moved with his family from military base to military base as a result of his father's career. During those times, he stated that he spent much of his time listening to Peter Gabriel, the Beatles and Motown.

Career
Page formed the pop group Q-Feel with his friend Brian Fairweather. Q-Feel experienced success with hit single "Dancing in Heaven (Orbital Be-Bop)". Soon after, Page and Fairweather moved to Los Angeles, where they met music executive Diane Poncher. She saw potential in Page and Fairweather and eventually became their manager.

At first Page and Fairweather collaborated with artists such as Kim Carnes, on her 1983 album Cafe Racers, Earth, Wind & Fire on their 1983 LP Electric Universe, and Barbra Streisand on her 1984 album Emotion. Page also played keyboards for Ray Parker Jr., on the 1984 Ghostbusters theme song. Page went on to work with Elton John's frequent lyricist Bernie Taupin. The duo performed on Maurice White's 1985 self titled album and wrote songs for Starship's 1985 LP Knee Deep in the Hoopla together with Heart's 1985 album Heart. Page later composed on Neil Diamond 1986 LP Headed for the Future, Lee Ritenour 1986 album Earth Run and Chaka Khan's 1986 LP Destiny.

He again collaborated with Taupin on his 1987 album Tribe and composed on Atlantic Starr's 1987 LP All in the Name of Love. Page also composed on Starship's 1987 LP No Protection and produced Robbie Robertson on his 1987 self titled album. That album has been certified Gold in the UK by the BPI.

Page went on to compose on Earth, Wind & Fire's 1988 LP The Best of Earth, Wind & Fire, Vol. 2. Page also produced Tom Jones on his 1988 LP Move Closer and Paul Young on his 1990 album Other Voices. Other Voices has been certified Gold in the UK by the BPI. He then produced Robbie Robertson on his Grammy Award-nominated 1991 LP Storyville. He later co-wrote Go West's hit singles "King of Wishful Thinking" and "Faithful". He co-wrote the title song, "Sing" for the soundtrack of the same name.

Page has also collaborated with Robbie Williams and Josh Groban.

Solo work
During 1994, Page issued his debut solo album In the House of Stone and Light. The title track, which he wrote reflecting on a visit to the Grand Canyon, was issued the same year. As a single, "In the House of Stone and Light" reached No. 14 on the Billboard Hot 100.

Soon afterwards, his parents and some dear friends died. He returned to the studio in 2008 to record his second album, In the Temple of the Muse for IroningBoard Records, an independent label started by Page and Poncher. Among the songs on In the Temple of the Muse are Page's recording of "Mi Morena" and "Blessed," (a song that Page described as a "commitment song").

Page's third album, A Temper of Peace, was released in 2012 followed in 2015  by Hotel of the Two Worlds. In 2017, he issued his fifth album, The Slender Sadness (The Love Songs). In 2018 he released The Amber of Memory, his first album of instrumental music.

In late 2019 Page started a music podcast called Radio OwlsNest. His seventh studio album, The Poetry of Collisions, was released digitally on 10 November 2020. Page released his eighth studio album, Fugitive Pieces, on 19 April 2021. Later in the same year, Page announced his ninth album, called The Occupation of Hope, his second instrumental album. It was released on 15 November 2021. Page released his second volume of The Poetry of Collisions, his tenth overall, on 11 July 2022.

Personal life
Page lives in Southern California.

Discography

Albums

Independent releases

Singles

Music videos

References

External links
 Martin Page's Official Website
 

English male singers
English new wave musicians
English songwriters
English record producers
English rock bass guitarists
Male bass guitarists
British soft rock musicians
Musicians from Southampton
1959 births
Living people
British expatriates in the United States
British male songwriters